A Family Affair is the debut studio album by Swedish singer-songwriter Mikael Bolyos. The album was issued on CD on 14 June 2007 by EMI, in conjunction with Bolyos' own independent record label Mikael Bolyos Music. It features the vocals of Bolyos' wife Marie Fredriksson (part of the duo Roxette), and Mats Ronander. The record received mixed reviews upon release, and failed to appear on the Swedish Albums Chart. "When the Lord Is About to Come" and "Me & My Guitar" were released as singles.

Critical reception

Håkan Persson of Borås Tidning said: "Mikael Bolyos has more or less chosen to stand in the shadow of his better half, Marie Fredriksson. He makes sixties-coloured drudgery and throw-away-pop, and his wife – who sings lead and choir – tries to take up as little space as possible. Quite frankly, there's nothing else to say [about the album]." A writer for Expressen commented on the album leaking several months before its release date: "The record company in crisis wants to blame the pirates. Come on. Isn't the real crisis that the album simply doesn't hold up? Who wants to hear Steely Dan with a singer who sucks? Or Roxette without real songs? Probably no one. With the help of extremely competent people, including his wife Marie Fredriksson and Mats Ronander, Micke Bolyos has recorded an album that not even the kindest of free listeners will waste hard disk space on."

Track listing

Credits and personnel
Credits adapted from the liner notes of A Family Affair.

 Mikael Bolyos – lead vocals, background vocals, instrumentation, production and mixing
 By Grace – choir 
 Marie Fredriksson – lead vocals, background vocals 
 Lennart Östlund – mixing 
 Mats Ronander – lead vocals, harmonica
 Alar Suurna – mixing

References

External links
 Official site
 Studio site

2007 debut albums